Blake Caparello (born 30 August 1985) is an Australian Light Heavyweight Professional Boxer. Challenged formidable Sergey Kovalev for his first World Title in 2014.

Professional career
Caparello made his professional debut at the age of 22 on August 16, 2009, with a unanimous decision against Aaron Ross at Shed 14 Central Pier Peninsula in Melbourne, Victoria

On 27 November 2009, in Caparello's 3rd professional fight he won the Vacant Victoria State Light Heavyweight Title against Dennis Okcal. He went on to retain the Title against Joel Casey on 9 April 2010.

On 5 August 2011, Caparello defeated Joseph Kwadjo by UD and won the Interim OPBF Light Heavyweight Title.

On 18 November 2011, Caparello defeated Michael Van Nimwegen by TKO to win the Vacant Australian Light Heavyweight Title.

On 18 April 2013, Caparello defeated Jorge Rodriguez Olivera by UD and won the PABA Light Heavyweight Title. He went on to retain the title against Daniel MacKinnon on 25 July 2013.

On 17 October 2013, Caparello defeated Allan Green by twelfth round UD to win the vacant International Boxing Organization Light Heavyweight title. Green failed to make weight for the bout, so the title was at stake for Caparello only and would have become vacant had Green won. The win against Green caught the eyes of U.S Promoter DiBella Entertainment and signed Caparello to a 3 fight deal.

Caparello would go on to make an impressive U.S debut on 31 January 2014, against Elvir Muriqi at Richard J. Codey Arena, West Orange, New Jersey. Where he would become victorious by Unanimous Decision after a 10 round bout.

Caparello challenged for his first world title on 2 August 2014, against WBO Light Heavyweight champion Sergey Kovalev. Caparello, undefeated before the bout, shocked Kovalev in the first round, knocking him down with a straight left hand but lost by second-round technical knockout.

On 13 December 2014, Caparello would bounce back from his loss against Kovalev, with a UD win against Maximiliano Jorge Gomez and won the WBO Asia Pacific Light Heavyweight Title.

On 5 June 2015, Caparello made his long awaited Super Middleweight debut and defeated Affif Belghecham by UD and won PABA and WBO Oriental Super Middleweight Titles.

On 14 July 2017, Caparello defeated Jordan Tai by TKO and won WBA Oceania Light Heavyweight title. He retained the title with a TKO win against Fabiano Pena on 13 October 2017.

On 16 March 2018, Caparello was a defeated by Isaac Chilemba for the WBC Light Heavyweight Title.

On 22 February 2019, Caparello defeated Reagan Dessaix by UD and won WBA Oceania Light Heavyweight Title.

Professional boxing record 

| style="text-align:center;" colspan="8"|30 Wins (13 knockouts, 17 decisions),  3 Losses, 1 Draw
|-  style="text-align:center; background:#e3e3e3;"
|  style="border-style:none none solid solid; "|Res.
|  style="border-style:none none solid solid; "|Record
|  style="border-style:none none solid solid; "|Opponent
|  style="border-style:none none solid solid; "|Type
|  style="border-style:none none solid solid; "|Rd., Time
|  style="border-style:none none solid solid; "|Date
|  style="border-style:none none solid solid; "|Location
|  style="border-style:none none solid solid; "|Notes
|- align=center
|Win
|29–3–1
|align=left| Reagan Dessaix
|
|
|
|align=left|
|align=left|
|- align=center
|Win
|28–3–1
|align=left| Lance Bryant
|
|
|
|align=left|
|align=left|
|- align=center
|Win
|27–3–1
|align=left| Trent Broadhurst
|
|
|
|align=left|
|align=left|
|- align=center
|Loss
|26–3–1
|align=left| Isaac Chilemba
|
|
|
|align=left|
|align=left|
|- align=center
|Win
|26–2–1
|align=left| Fabiano Pena
|
|
|
|align=left|
|align=left|
|- align=center
|Win
|25–2–1
|align=left| Jordan Tai
|
|
|
|align=left|
|align=left|
|- align=center
|Win
|24–2–1
|align=left| Ricky Torrez
|
|
|
|align=left|
|align=left|
|- align=center
|Win
|23–2–1
|align=left| Rogerio Damasco
|
|
|
|align=left|
|align=left|
|- align=center
|Loss
|22–2–1
|align=left| Andre Dirrell
|
|
|
|align=left|
|align=left|
|- align=center
|Win
|22–1–1
|align=left| Luke Sharp
|
|
|
|align=left|
|align=left|
|- align=center
|Win
|21–1–1
|align=left| Affif Belghecham
|
|
|
|align=left|
|align=left|
|- align=center
|Win
|20–1–1
|align=left| Maximiliano Jorge Gomez
|
|
|
|align=left|
|align=left|
|- align=center
|Loss
|19–1–1
|align=left| Sergey Kovalev
|
|
|
|align=left|
|align=left|
|- align=center
|Win
|19–0–1
|align=left| Elvir Muriqi
|
|
|
|align=left|
|align=left|
|- align=center
|Win
|18–0–1
|align=left| Allan Green
|
|
|
|align=left|
|align=left|
|- align=center
|Win
|17–0–1
|align=left| Daniel MacKinnon
|
|
|
|align=left|
|align=left|
|- align=center
|Win
|16–0–1
|align=left| Jorge Rodriguez Olivera
|
|
|
|align=left|
|align=left|
|- align=center
|Win
|15–0–1
|align=left| Ayitey Powers
|
|
|
|align=left|
|align=left|
|- align=center
|Win
|14–0–1
|align=left| Aaron Pryor Jr
|
|
|
|align=left|
|align=left|
|- align=center
|Win
|13–0–1
|align=left| Dante Craig
|
|
|
|align=left|
|align=left|
|- align=center
|Win
|12–0–1
|align=left| Robert Berridge
|
|
|
|align=left|
|align=left|
|- align=center
|Win
|11–0–1
|align=left| Kevin Engel
|
|
|
|align=left|
|align=left|
|- align=center
|Win
|10–0–1
|align=left| Michael Van Nimwegen
|
|
|
|align=left|
|align=left|
|- align=center
|Win
|9–0–1
|align=left| Joseph Kwadjo
|
|
|
|align=left|
|align=left|
|- align=center
|Win
|8–0–1
|align=left| Togasilimai Letoa
|
|
|
|align=left|
|align=left|
|- align=center
|Win
|7–0–1
|align=left| Komgrit Nanakorn
|
|
|
|align=left|
|align=left|
|- align=center
|Win
|6–0–1
|align=left| Michael Bolling
|
|
|
|align=left|
|align=left|
|- align=center
|style="background: #B0C4DE"|Draw
|5–0–1
|align=left| Shane McConville
|
|
|
|align=left|
|align=left|
|- align=center
|Win
|5–0
|align=left| Kane McKay
|
|
|
|align=left|
|align=left|
|- align=center
|Win
|4–0
|align=left| Joel Casey
|
|
|
|align=left|
|align=left|
|- align=center
|Win
|3–0
|align=left| Dennis Okcal
|
|
|
|align=left|
|align=left|
|- align=center
|Win
|2–0
|align=left| Joshua Tai
|
|
|
|align=left|
|align=left|
|- align=center
|Win
|1–0
|align=left| Aaron Ross
|
|
|
|align=left|
|align=left|

References

External links
 
 

1985 births
Living people
Boxers from Melbourne
Light-heavyweight boxers
International Boxing Organization champions
Australian male boxers
People from Essendon, Victoria
Sportsmen from Victoria (Australia)